Jessica Costanzo (born 19 January 1984) is an Italian politician.

Political career 
She was elected to the Chamber of Deputies in the 2018 general election. She was expelled from the party for voting against the Draghi government in 2021.

In May 2022, she joined the Italexit party.

References 

Living people
1984 births
Politicians from Turin
Five Star Movement politicians
Independent politicians in Italy
Italexit politicians
21st-century Italian politicians
21st-century Italian women politicians
Deputies of Legislature XVIII of Italy
Politicians affected by a party expulsion process
Women members of the Chamber of Deputies (Italy)